Larbatache is a town and city in Boumerdès Province, Algeria. According to the 2008 census it has a population of 19,356.

Notable people

 Lamine Abid, Algerian footballer.
 Mohamed Hassaïne, Algerian journalist.

References

Communes of Boumerdès Province
Cities in Algeria
Algeria